Kaleh-ye Zard is a village in Jalalvand Rural District, Firuzabad District, Kermanshah County, Kermanshah Province, Iran. At the 2006 census, its population was 24, in 8 families.

References 

Populated places in Kermanshah County